Song Jiang was a Chinese historical figure who led an armed rebellion against the ruling Song Dynasty in the early 12th century. His band marauded over a region straddling the present-day Chinese provinces of Shandong and Henan. They eventually surrendered to the Imperial Court. The historical Song Jiang was turned into a fictional character in Water Margin, which became one of the four famous Classic Chinese Novels. He is the central figure in the book, and the leader of the 108 heroes who come together as bandits in Shandong's Liangshan Marsh.

Life
Song Jiang is mentioned in the History of Song, the most authoritative of records on the history of the Song dynasty. His name occurs in the portion relating to Emperor Huizong that: 

Another account, from the portion relating to Zhang Shuye in the History of Song, records the following:

In Water Margin

The fictional Song Jiang in Water Margin is based on the historical one and folktales that had been circulating in the Shandong region. One tale, for example, is about "36 huge banners and 72 smaller banners of local bandits", a likely origin of the 108 Stars of Destiny in Water Margin.

Background
In Water Margin, Song Jiang is depicted as short, swarthy, and having a big squarish mouth and eyes like those of a fenghuang. He lives and works in Yuncheng County, where he serves as a clerk of the magistrate. He is nicknamed "Timely Rain" because he is generous and helpful, often assisting heroes in difficulties and the indigent. As he is known to be filial, he is also called "Filial and Righteous Dark Third Son" and "Dark Song Jiang", with "dark" referring to his complexion. After all the 108 Stars of Destiny come together at Liangshan, he goes by another nickname, "Protector of Justice", to advertise his conviction in life. He is trained in both scholarly and martial arts, but he is apparently not a great fighter. He has a younger brother named Song Qing. 

Song Jiang is a close friend of Yuncheng's chief constables, Zhu Tong and Lei Heng, as well as Chao Gai, the headman of Yuncheng's Dongxi Village. After Chao and his six confederates hijacked valuables from a conveyance to the Grand Tutor Cai Jing in the imperial capital Dongjing, the government of Jizhou is under pressure to solve the case as Yellow Mud Ridge, the site of the robbery, is within its jurisdiction. He Tao, the chief constable of Jizhou, is tasked with tracking down the robbers. Song runs into He at the magistrate office of Yuncheng, who tells him he has identified Chao Gai as the mastermind. Upon hearing this, Song excuses himself and rushes to Dongxi Village to warn Chao. The robbers thus manage to pack up in time and escape. They seek refuge in the outlaw stronghold at Liangshan Marsh. But Wang Lun, the chief of Liangshan, does not welcome them. Chao is elected in his place after Lin Chong kills Wang.

Killing Yan Poxi
Meanwhile, Song Jiang has taken Yan Poxi as his mistress at her mother's insistence as their repayment for his funding of her father's funeral. They got along without problem initially. However, Yan Poxi soon detested Song Jiang, who has no fancy for women, after knowing Zhang Wenyuan, Song's clerical assistant, and getting into an affair with him.

To convey his gratitude, Chao Gai sends Liu Tang to deliver one hundred pieces of gold each to Song Jiang and Zhu Tong, who has also aided his escape. Liu also brings along a letter from Chao for Song. Song is shocked to find Liu greeting him on the street one night. He refuses to take all the gold, accepting only one piece as a token. That night he is forced to go to sleep with Yan Poxi by Yan's mother. Yan discovers Chao's letter, which reveals Song's involvement with the outlaws of Liangshan. She threatens to report him to the authorities unless he meets three demands: divorce her and allow her to marry Zhang Wenyuan; let her keep all the things he has given her; and hand over all the gold pieces he received from Chao. Song agrees to the first two but could not accede to the third as he has accepted only one gold piece. As Yan refuses to believe him and repeatedly threatens to expose him, Song becomes agitated and kills her with a dagger that he always carries in his bag. He flees to hide in a pit in the house of his father. Zhu Tong, who is sent to arrest him, locates him in the vault as Song has once told him about it. But Zhu lets him go. Song runs away from Yuncheng and becomes a fugitive.

Battle of Qingfeng Fort
Song Jiang takes shelter in the residence of nobleman Chai Jin, where he meets Wu Song. He meets Wu again, who has become an itinerant priest to hide his identity after committing a series of killings, when he stays at the Kong Family Manor at Mount White Tiger. Song next moves to the house of Hua Rong, garrison commandant of Qingfeng Fort (清風寨; in present-day Qingzhou, Shandong), invited by Hua. When he is near to the fort, he is trapped and nearly killed by the three chieftains of Mount Qingfeng (清風山) -- Yan Shun, Wang Ying and Zheng Tianshou. The trio treat him with respect upon learning he is Song Jiang as his chivalrous deeds are widely known. Song prevents Wang Ying from raping a woman he has abducted and secures her release when he finds out she is the wife of Liu Gao, the governor of Qingfeng Fort and Hua Rong's superior.

On the Lantern Festival night, Song Jiang, who is then living in Hua Rong's house, goes outdoor to watch the celebrations. Liu Gao's wife spots him and lies to her husband that Song had abducted her at Mount Qingfeng and attempted to rape her. Believing his wife, Liu orders Song arrested. Hua Rong barges into Liu's house and frees Song. As Song flees to Mount Qingfeng following Hua's advice he is waylaid and re-arrested by Liu's men. Meanwhile, Hua is seized in an ambush by Huang Xin, a military officer sent from Qingzhou prefecture, which oversees Qingfeng Fort. As Huang escorts Song and Hua back to Qingzhou, the convoy is intercepted by the bandits of Mount Qingfeng, who rescue the two prisoners. Liu is killed in the fight while Huang escapes. Qingzhou sends Qin Ming, a higher officer, to eliminate Mount Qingfeng. But Qin is caught in a trap and brought before Song. Although Qin is glad to meet Song, having heard much about him, he refuses to join the stronghold. As Qin spends the night at Mount Qingfeng, Song sends bandits led by a man disguised as him to pillage and raze a suburb of Qingzhou. Murong Yanda, the governor of Qingzhou, falls for the ruse and executes Qin's family. That forces Qin to defect to Song's camp. As Qinghou is likely to send a bigger force, Song suggests the group go join the band at Liangshan. But he leaves the group halfway when he runs into Shi Yong, who hands him a letter from Song Qing which falsely claims that their father has passed away.

Exile to Jiangzhou
Song Jiang returns to Yuncheng to find his father alive. The old man has faked death to lure him back to prevent him from falling into bad company. Alerted to his return, Yuncheng's authorities arrest Song over the killing of Yan Poxi. Due to his past service at the magistrate office, Song is spared the death penalty. He is tattooed on the face and exiled to Jiangzhou (江州; present-day Jiujiang, Jiangxi).

On the way, Song Jiang and his two escorts pass by Jieyang Ridge and are nearly butchered by the innkeeper Li Li after being drugged. He is saved by Li Jun, another of his admirers. Informed of Song's exile, Li Jun has been waiting by the Xunyang River expecting to meet him. He happens to come to Li Li's inn for refreshment. They revive Song after confirming his identity through the official document on the escorts. They treat him with hospitality before seeing him off.

At Jieyang Town, Song generously tips Xue Yong, a street performer of martial arts, seeing that no onlooker awards him for his show. In doing that he offends the brothers Mu Hong and Mu Chun, who wield immense influence over the town. Because Xue, who is from out of town, has not gone to pay them respects, the Mus have ordered the townsfolk to not give him a cent. That night Song and his escorts happen to be offered accommodation in the Mus' house by their kindly father. When he discovers they are in danger, the three flee. Pursued by the Mus, they desperately board the boat of pirate Zhang Heng at Xunyang River. Midway across the river, Zhang wants to kill them. Song is again saved by Li Jun, who passes by in his boat. Zhang and the Mu brothers are shocked to learn that the man is Song Jiang. Song receives warm treatment from his new friends before proceeding on to Jiangzhou.

At Jiangzhou, Song Jiang meets the chief warden Dai Zong, who is a friend of Wu Yong, the chief strategist of Liangshan, and jailer Li Kui. He and Li take to each other as Song is generous and Li straightforward. Song also meets the fishmonger Zhang Shun, Zhang Heng‘s younger brother. As Song is allowed to move freely in and out of jail by Dai, one day he goes alone to drink at a restaurant on the bank of the Xunyang River. Feeling miserable over his misfortunes, he writes a poem in drunkenness on the wall in the eatery. He forgets the incident the next day.

Huang Wenbing, a petty official, discovers the poem, which he determines to be seditious, and reports it to Cai Jiu, the prefect of Jiangzhou. Cai, a son of Cai Jing, orders Song arrested and sends Dai Zong to Dongjing to seek advice from his father on the matter. However, Dai ends up in Liangshan disclosing the news to the outlaws. Wu Yong forges a letter ordering Cai Jiu to transfer Song Jiang to Dongjing. The plan is to rescue Song when he is conveyed there. But Huang Wenbing spots a giveaway in the letter. Furious, Cai Jiu sentences both Song and Dai to death. Wu Yong meanwhile has realised the mistake and sends a number of chieftains to Jiangzhou to rescue them. They storm the execution ground and carry the two away. But they are stranded at a riverbank. Fortunately Li Jun arrives with all the friends of Song Jiang from the Jieyang region in boats and they are ferried to safety. After killing Huang Wenbing, Song goes with the bunch to Liangshan, where he takes the second position after Chao Gai.

As chief of Liangshan
Song Jiang goes home to fetch his father and Song Qing to Liangshan. But news of his return leaks and constables come after him. Fleeing, Song stumbles into the temple of a goddess and hides in a closet. Falling into a nap, he dreams of meeting the goddess, who gives him three heavenly books which she says would guide him in his leadership of Liangshan. He wakes up to find himself holding the three books. 
In almost every of Liangshan's military conflicts, Song Jiang is the commander. He leads the three offensives on the Zhu Family Manor, the attack on Gaotangzhou to save Chai Jin, the fight against Huyan Zhuo's attempt to stamp out Liangshan, the battle at Qingzhou which ends with absorption of three strongholds, the effort to rescue Shi Jin and Lu Zhishen at Huazhou, the engagement with Fan Rui at Mount Mangdang, the assault on Daming to save Lu Junyi and Shi Xiu, the face-off against Guan Sheng, and the expedition against the Zeng Family Fortress to avenge the death of Chao Gai. Chao is killed in action when he, for the first time heading a military force, battles with the Zeng Family Fortress. Song Jiang becomes Liangshan's acting chief pending the capture of Chao's killer Shi Wengong. Chao has left word that whoever seizes his killer would succeed him. Although it is Lu Junyi who catches Shi, in the end Song Jiang becomes the chief of Liangshan. That comes after he beat Lu in a contest in which they agreed whoever overran the prefecture assigned to him first would be made chief. Song conquered Dongping first while Lu stalled in his effort to take Dongchang.  

Although his crimes are egregious and he is regarded as a colossal threat by the government, Song Jiang harbours the wish to serve the Song Empire. He crafts a slogan "Deliver Justice on Heaven's behalf" (替天行道)" to signal that Liangshan is committed to just causes and is led by people loyal to the emperor. After many attempts, including enlisting the help of Li Shishi, a courtesan patronised by Emperor Huizong, Song Jiang finally wins amnesty for Liangshan. But the emperor sends them on a series of expeditions against invaders from the Liao Empire and rebel forces in Song territory to prove their loyalty. The last of these, which is against the rebel Fang La, is highly costly, with at least two thirds of the 108 heroes killed in action or by disease.

Death
Through with the expeditions, Song Jiang is appointed governor of Chuzhou (楚州; present-day Huai'an, Jiangsu). But the corrupt officials in the imperial court are unhappy that he is doing fine. They send him a jar of poisoned wine in the emperor's name which he is obliged to drink. When Song Jiang realises he has been poisoned, he is worried that the hot-tempered Li Kui will rebel against the Song Empire and tarnish the good name of Liangshan. So, he invites Li to Chuzhou and offers him the same wine. Both of them die.

In the last chapter of Water Margin, the ghosts of Song Jiang and Li Kui appear in Emperor Huizong's dream and tell him about their wrongful deaths. Although the emperor orders an inquiry, it comes to nothing as the key witness – the emissary who sent the wine to Song Jiang – has died mysteriously on the way back to Dongjing. The emperor makes amends to Song only by conferring on him a posthumous title.

Song Jiang's seditious poem
The following two poems were written by Song Jiang at Xunyang Tower in Jiangzhou after he got drunk. It is the second one that carries a seditious message.

Song Jiang then reads what he has written, laughing hysterically. He consumes more drink and starts to dance in a frenzy of joy. He picks up the inkbrush and writes another four lines:

He then signs off: "Work by Song Jiang from Yuncheng" (鄆城宋江作).

The second poem is deemed seditious because of the last two lines. Huang Chao launched an uprising near the end of the Tang dynasty, which led to its collapse. Huang Wenbing interprets these two lines to mean: "If Song Jiang ever gets an opportunity to start a rebellion against the Song dynasty, he will do worse things than even Huang Chao did."

See also

 List of Water Margin minor characters#Song Jiang's story for a list of supporting minor characters from Song Jiang's story.

Notes

References
 
 
 
 
 
 
 Toqto'a (ed.) (1343). History of Song (Song Shi).
 

Specific

36 Heavenly Spirits
Song dynasty rebels